The Central Arkansas Bears men's soccer team represents the University of Central Arkansas (UCA) in the ASUN Conference of NCAA Division I men's soccer. Before joining the ASUN on July 1, 2021, UCA had been an all-sports member of the Southland Conference, which sponsors soccer only for women, and had played men's soccer in the Sun Belt Conference. The Bears play their home matches at the Bill Stephens Track/Soccer Complex located on the UCA campus in Conway, Arkansas. The team is currently coached by Frank Kohlenstein.

Record by year
Reference

References

External links
 

 
Soccer clubs in Arkansas